Ramannapeta is a village in Yadadri Bhuvanagiri district of the Indian state of Telangana. It is located in Ramannapeta mandal of Bhongir division.

Geography
It has an average elevation of 322 meters (1073 ft).

Nearest cities
Nalgonda-35 km, Suryapet-68 km, Hyderabad-83 km.

References

Mandal headquarters in Yadadri Bhuvanagiri district
Census towns in Yadadri Bhuvanagiri district